The discography of Tom Grennan, an English singer and songwriter. His debut album, Lighting Matches, was released in July 2018. The album peaked at number five on the UK Albums Chart. The album includes the single "Found What I've Been Looking For". His second album Evering Road began his breakthrough in the UK, charting at number one on the UK Albums Chart and including the commercially successful singles "This Is the Place", "Little Bit of Love", "Let's Go Home Together" with Ella Henderson and "Don't Break the Heart". In 2021 and 2022, he was also featured as a guest vocalist on the top-ten singles "By Your Side" with Calvin Harris and "Not Over Yet" with KSI.

Studio albums

Extended plays

Singles

As lead artist

As featured artist

Other charted songs

Guest appearances

Other releases

Songwriting credits

Music videos

Notes

References

Discographies of British artists
Alternative rock discographies
Pop music discographies